William Daniel Lumley (born 28 December 1989) is an English footballer who played as a goalkeeper mainly in England.

Career
Born in Loughton, Essex, Lumley started his career as a youth player at Wolverhampton Wanderers, before joining the Glenn Hoddle Academy in Spain following his release in 2008. Glenn Hoddle commented on the player saying; "Billy impressed me as a goalkeeper with his all-round ability during the selection process" and "he not only demonstrated his vision and shot stopping prowess, but also his willingness to learn, something critical to his future success".

In July 2009, he joined Brentford on trial, although was not offered a contract. Alongside eight other players, Lumley joined Conference National side Grays Athletic on 5 August 2009, before joining Conference North team Stafford Rangers. He had an unsuccessful trial at Swansea City in November 2009, before joining Northampton Town on non-contract terms on 23 December. Northampton manager, Ian Sampson claimed that Lumley was interesting a number of clubs and tried to sign him before he joined Wolves. He made his Football League debut on 20 February 2010 for Northampton Town in the 3–2 away loss to Crewe Alexandra.

Lumley joined Conference South club Eastleigh in March 2010, making his debut against St Albans City on 6 March. His last game for Eastleigh was the 2–0 defeat to Woking on 5 April 2010.

The following season, 2010–11, Lumley had a short spell at Isthmian League Premier Division club Billericay Town before moving to Jerez Industrial. In 18 appearances for Jerez he conceded 18 goals.

In August 2011, he signed for Maidenhead United.

In August 2013, Lumley had been released by mutual consent because he didn't want to fight for a first team spot with new signing Elvijs Putnins.

References

External links

1989 births
Living people
People from Loughton
English footballers
English expatriate footballers
Association football goalkeepers
Wolverhampton Wanderers F.C. players
Grays Athletic F.C. players
Stafford Rangers F.C. players
Northampton Town F.C. players
Eastleigh F.C. players
Billericay Town F.C. players
Jerez Industrial CF players
Maidenhead United F.C. players
English Football League players
National League (English football) players
Tercera División players
Expatriate footballers in Spain